Aqan (also Romanized as A‘qān; also known as Aghān) is a village in Nowjeh Mehr Rural District, Siah Rud District, Jolfa County, East Azerbaijan Province, Iran. At the 2006 census, its population was 23, in 5 families.

References 

Populated places in Jolfa County